Paul Zastupnevich (December 24, 1921 – May 9, 1997) was an American costume designer and assistant to movie producer and director Irwin Allen, active in film from 1959 to 1980. He was nominated for the Academy Award for Best Costume Design for three films produced by Allen: The Poseidon Adventure (1972), The Swarm (1978) and When Time Ran Out (1980).

Biography
Born in Homestead, Pennsylvania, his education included a degree in fashion design. Zastupnevich's early career was spent acting in stage productions and designing costumes for many of them. In addition to costume design in Irwin Allen's productions, Zastupnevich appeared in a number of Allen's movies and television series, such as Voyage to the Bottom of the Sea and Lost in Space.

Zastupnevich ran his own boutique, "The House of Z", in Pasadena, California, with his sister Olga, and he designed clothes for actresses. In 1994, he was the special guest of honor at a convention in England.  He presented several talks at the convention, covering his work with Irwin Allen.  The same year he became honorary president of the Irwin Allen News Network, which is dedicated to all of Allen's works. In 1996 he was living in Palm Desert, California.

Selected filmography

Actor
 Voyage to the Bottom of the Seas (5 episodes, 1964–1965)
 Lost in Space (3 episodes, 1965–1967)

Costume designer
 The Big Circus (1959)
 The Lost World (1960)
 Voyage to the Bottom of the Sea (1961)
 Five Weeks in a Balloon (film) (1962)
 Lost in Space (51 episodes, 1966–1968)
 Land of the Giants (3 episodes, 1968–1969)
 The Poseidon Adventure (1972)
 The Towering Inferno (1974)
 Viva Knievel! (1977)
 The Swarm (1978)
 Beyond the Poseidon Adventure (1979)
 When Time Ran Out (1980)
 Alice in Wonderland (1985)

Stage
 The Man who came to Dinner (as Banjo)
 David Copperfield (as Mr Dick)
 The Madwoman of Chaillot (as French Sgt. of Police)
 Plain and Fancy (Jolly Jacob Yoder)
 Blind Alley (as young man)
 Affairs of State
 Hazel Kirke
 Oklahoma
 Separate Rooms
 Meet the Wife
 Boy Meets Girl
 St. Joan
 Nathan the Wise
 Plain and Fancy
 Anastasia (as Petrovin)
 Solid Gold Cadillac (as Gillie)

Award nominations

References

External links 
 
 
 Paul Zastupnevich costume design drawings, 1960–1979, Margaret Herrick Library, Academy of Motion Picture Arts and Sciences

1921 births
1997 deaths
American fashion designers
American male television actors
American costume designers
People from Homestead, Pennsylvania
People from Palm Desert, California
American people of Russian descent
Burials at Forest Lawn Memorial Park (Hollywood Hills)
20th-century American male actors